Hey is the second studio album by German recording artist Andreas Bourani. Produced by Bourani along with Julius Hartog, Peter "Jem" Seifert, Philipp Steinke and several other musicians, it was released by Vertigo Berlin on 9 May 2014 in German-speaking Europe. Boosted by the number one success of its leading single "Auf uns", it reached the top ten of the German Albums Chart.

Track listing

Charts

Weekly charts

Year-end charts

Certifications

References

Andreas Bourani albums
2014 albums